Magura may refer to:
 Magura GmbH, a German company
 Magura, a mountain in Magura National Park, Poland
 Magura, a mountain in the Silesian Beskids in Poland
 Magura (mountain), a mountain in the Western Tatras in Poland
 Magura Cave in Bulgaria
 Magura District, a district of Khulna Division, Bangladesh
 Magura Sadar Upazila, an upazila in this district
 Magura, Pirojpur, a village in Pirojpur District, Bangladesh
 Magura Glacier on Livingston Island, Antarctica

See also
 Măgura (disambiguation), places in Romania